Alan Oke is a British tenor. Born in London and raised in Scotland, he studied both at the Royal Scottish Academy of Music and Drama in Glasgow and with Hans Hotter in Munich.

Career 
Following a successful career as a baritone he made his debut as a tenor in 1992 singing Brighella in Ariadne auf Naxos for Garsington Opera. Since then he has sung a wide variety of roles with Scottish Opera, Opera North, the Royal Opera, English National Opera and Opera New Zealand as well as appearances at the Edinburgh, Aldeburgh, Bregenz and Ravenna Festivals.

He portrayed Marlow in Tarik O'Regan's Heart of Darkness at the Royal Opera House and Gandhi in Philip Glass's Satyagraha for the English National Opera and the Metropolitan Opera, New York City.

In 2016 he premiered the role of The Major in Elena Langer's opera Figaro Gets a Divorce, at the Welsh National Opera.

He played Peter Grimes in the performance of Britten's opera on Aldeburgh Beach 2013, filmed as Grimes on the Beach.

He lives in Edinburgh, Scotland.

References
Aberdeen Press and Journal, World-class opera beams into town, 19 November 2008.
Seckerson, Edward, Gandhi through the looking glass, The Independent, 10 April 2007. 
Tommasini, Anthony, Longing in England: ‘Death in Venice’ on Two Stages, The New York Times, 11 June 2007.

External links
Biography on Askonas Holt Artist Management

English operatic tenors
20th-century British male opera singers
Living people
Alumni of the Royal Conservatoire of Scotland
Grammy Award winners
Singers from London
Year of birth missing (living people)
21st-century British male opera singers